The  of Japan make up a large network of controlled-access toll expressways.

History 
Following World War II, Japan's economic revival led to a massive increase in personal automobile use. However the existing road system was inadequate to deal with the increased demand; in 1956 only 23% of national highways were paved, which included only two thirds of the main Tokyo-Osaka road (National Route 1).

In April 1956 the Japan Highway Public Corporation (JH) was established by the national government with the task of constructing and managing a nationwide network of expressways. In 1957 permission was given to the corporation to commence construction of the Meishin Expressway linking Nagoya and Kobe, the first section of which opened to traffic in 1963.

In addition to the national expressway network administered by JH, the government established additional corporations to construct and manage expressways in urban areas. The Metropolitan Expressway Public Corporation (responsible for the Shuto Expressway) was established in 1959, and the Hanshin Expressway Public Corporation (responsible for the Hanshin Expressway) was established in 1962.

In 1966 a plan was formally enacted for a  national expressway network. Under this plan construction of expressways running parallel to the coastlines of Japan would be given priority over those traversing the mountainous interior. In April 2018, completed sections of the network totaled  

In October 2005 JH, the Metropolitan Expressway Public Corporation, the Hanshin Expressway Public Corporation, and the Honshū-Shikoku Bridge Authority (managing three fixed-link connections between Honshu and Shikoku) were privatized under the reform policies of the government of Prime Minister Junichiro Koizumi. These privatizations are technically converting the corporations into stock companies with no stock sold to the general public, since the Government of Japan hold controlling shares in the successor companies. The expressway network of JH was divided into three companies based on geography - East Nippon Expressway Company (E-NEXCO), Central Nippon Expressway Company (C-NEXCO), and West Nippon Expressway Company (W-NEXCO). The Metropolitan Expressway Public Corporation transferred its authority to the Metropolitan Expressway Company, while the Hanshin Expressway Public Corporation transferred its authority to the Hanshin Expressway Company. The Honshu-Shikoku Bridge Authority became the Honshu-Shikoku Bridge Expressway Company, whose operations are planned to eventually be absorbed into those of W-NEXCO.

Finances

Japan's expressway development has been financed largely with debt. It was intended to make the expressways free when they are paid off. The Meishin Expressway and Tomei Expressway debt has been fully paid off since 1990. It was decided in 1972 that tolls would be pooled from all expressways to provide a single source of operating funds, since some sections were little used. Earthquake resistant construction methods have added to costs, as well as extensive soundwalling. In March 2009 (then) Prime Minister Taro Aso unveiled  a plan to reduce tolls to ¥1,000 on weekends and national holidays. Tolls on weekdays would be cut by around 30 percent.

National expressways

 make up the majority of expressways in Japan. This network boasts an uninterrupted link between Aomori Prefecture at the northern part of Honshu and Kagoshima Prefecture at the southern part of Kyushu, linking Shikoku as well. Additional expressways serve travellers in Hokkaido and on Okinawa Island, although those are not connected to the Honshu-Kyushu-Shikoku grid.

Features

Most expressways are four lanes with a central reservation (median). Some expressways in close proximity to major urban areas are six lanes, while in rural areas are constructed as undivided two-lane expressway. Two-lane expressway sections are built to a standard that allows conversion to four lanes in the future.

Vehicles unable to reach 50 km/h, such as tractors and mopeds, are forbidden from using the expressways. Variable speed limits are also in effect on most expressways and speeds are temporarily reduced due to adverse driving conditions.

Many rest facilities such as parking areas (usually only with toilets or small shops) and service areas (usually with many more amenities such as restaurants and gas stations) serve travellers along national expressways.

Route numbering
On October 24, 2016, the Japanese Ministry of Land, Infrastructure, Transport and Tourism had introduced a new format of route numbering system for national expressways. Expressway route numbers begin with the prefix E or C (for circular route) followed by their respective numbers. Expressway routes are numbered according to the parallel national highway routes; for example, the E1 Tomei Expressway runs parallel with the National Route 1. However, there are exceptions in this rule, and some expressways that are assigned with the two-digit numbers greater than 59 which are not used for the national highway route numbers. The E64 Tsugaru Expressway is an example of this exception as it parallels National Route 101.

If there are more than one expressway being constructed in parallel with their respective national highways, newer expressways within the same corridor carry the suffix A at the end of their route numbers. For example, the Chūgoku Expressway and San'yō Expressway both run in parallel along the National Route 2 corridor and the San'yō Expressway is assigned the route code of E2 for being constructed first, and the newer Chūgoku Expressway is assigned the route number of E2A.

Tolls
National expressways are expensive to use, with the  journey from Tokyo to Nagoya on the Tōmei Expressway costing ¥7,100 (roughly $70 or £50) in tolls for an ordinary car. According to the Japan Times, expressway tolls in Japan are three times as high as in France.

With a few exceptions, tolls on national expressways are based on distance travelled. When entering the expressway, one collects a ticket, which can be inserted along with the fare into a machine or handed to an attendant upon exiting the expressway.  There is also an Electronic Toll Collection (ETC) card system installed in many cars which automatically pays at the toll gate.  As of 2001 toll fees consist of a 150 yen terminal charge plus a fee which depends on the distance travelled.  The rate of this fee depends on the type of vehicle as shown in the following table.

Tolls are always rounded to the nearest 10 yen and include consumption tax. If there are two or more possible routes from the entrance to the exit, the toll will be calculated based on the shortest (cheapest) route.

Tolls collected from all routes are pooled into a single fund and are used to repay the entire network. It is expected that all national expressways in Japan will be fully repaid 45 years after privatization (2050).

Some future national expressways are planned to be built according to the New Direct Control System, whereby national and local governments will absorb the burden for expressway construction and operate toll-free upon completion.

Urban expressways

 are intra-city expressways that are found in many of Japan's largest urban areas. Due to the nature of urban expressways going through dense urban areas combined with weak eminent domain powers in Japan, urban expressways have much lower design speed compared to national expressways and are constructed as viaducts or as underground tunnels along existing arterial roads.

The two largest urban expressway networks are the Shuto Expressway in the Tokyo area and the Hanshin Expressway in the Osaka area. There are other smaller networks in Nagoya, Hiroshima, Kitakyūshū, and Fukuoka. Each network is managed separately from each other (the Fukuoka and Kitakyūshū Expressways are managed by the same company but are not physically connected to each other).

Safety
In 2019, there were 163 fatalities, 527 serious injuries and 11,702 minor injuries on all expressways, all of which were lower than in 2018.

Others

If a road for motor vehicles only cannot be classified as a national or urban expressway, it may be classified into one of the following categories.

Roads in this category are built to facilitate future incorporation into the main route of a national expressway. Examples include the Michinoku Toll Road, the Higashi-Mito Road and the Futtsu Tateyama Road.

Roads in this category are national highways built to expressway standards as designated by the Minister of Land, Infrastructure and Transport. Examples include the Ken-Ō Expressway and the Tōkai-Kanjō Expressway.

References

External links
Ministry of Land, Infrastructure and Transport, Road Bureau
Map of expressway routes 
全国の高速道路ガイド　

Lists of roads in Japan
Transport systems